Filip Hjelmland (born 10 September 1998) is a speedway rider from Sweden.

Speedway career 
Hjelmland came to prominence in 2017, when he won a silver medal at the European U19 Championship.

He became a regular member of the Sweden national under-21 speedway team and helped them win a bronze medal at the 2019 Team Junior European Championship final. He was then called up to the Sweden national speedway team and represented them in the 2019 Speedway of Nations.

In 2022, he rode for Dackarna in the Swedish Eliserien and Ostrów in the Ekstrasliga (the highest leagues in Sweden and Poland).

References 

Living people
1998 births
Swedish speedway riders